The Dublin Castle is a pub and live music venue in Camden Town, London. It was built for Irish navvies working on railways in London, but gained prominence as a venue in the late 1970s after the band Madness established a live reputation there. Subsequently, it was an important venue in the early stages of several bands' careers and contributed to the Britpop musical genre. Amy Winehouse was a regular visitor to the pub.

History
The pub was built to serve workmen on the nearby railway, as part of a newly constructed group of buildings. It catered for Irish immigrants to London, in order to segregate them away from other nationalities and avoid racial-related assaults. Music was originally restricted to occasional traditional Irish sessions. The emergence of other venues around Camden Town, including the Roundhouse, Dingwalls and the Electric Ballroom brought an increased interest in live music to the area, including the Dublin Castle. The pub can now accommodate an audience up to 200 people.

Madness first attempted to secure a gig at the venue in late 1978, when they were still known as the Camden Invaders. They first performed at the venue on 16 January 1979. According to singer Suggs, the group had to pretend they were a jazz band to get a booking. Landlord Alo Conlon invited the group back for a residency at the venue, and helped to establish their reputation.

Conlon hand picked bands to play in the pub that he thought would attract an audience, and word of mouth spread so that A&R scouts would visit the pub to see what up and coming acts were available. The pub was an important venue for Britpop acts in the 1990s, as it was often the first major London gig for bands that later found commercial success, including Blur. Amy Winehouse performed regularly at the venue and occasionally helped to serve drinks to customers.

In 2008, Conlon received a lifetime achievement award for his services to the pub industry in Camden. He died in January 2009 aged 73. A street party was held on Parkway, with Suggs in attendance.

Events
The Dublin Castle regularly hosts live music events from Wednesday to Sunday every week.

It has also long hosted a popular open jam on Tuesday nights, which has included appearances from major bands such as The Libertines. After a hiatus, the open jam has been restarted as Redrock Jam as of November 2016.

Redrock Jam is hosted by local band Redwire, who also hosted Redrock Festival at the same venue in October 2016 and again in September 2017.

References
Citations

Sources

External links

Buildings and structures in the London Borough of Camden
Music venues in London
Camden Town
Pubs in the London Borough of Camden